Assara turciella is a species of snout moth in the genus Assara. It was described by Roesler, in 1973, and is known from Turkey.

References

Phycitini
Moths described in 1973
Endemic fauna of Turkey
Moths of Asia